Marion Bertrand (born 2 November 1984 in Grasse, France) is an alpine skier from France. She competed for France at the 2014 Winter Olympics in the alpine skiing events.

References

External links
  (alpine)
  (cross-country)
 
 
 

1984 births
Living people
Olympic alpine skiers of France
Alpine skiers at the 2014 Winter Olympics
French female alpine skiers
People from Grasse
Sportspeople from Alpes-Maritimes